Mangalore Premier League(MPL) is an Indian Twenty20 cricket league established by the Karnataka State Cricket Association(KSCA).

The IPL players K C Cariappa, Kings Punjab, Shivil Kaushik, Gujarat Lions and Kishore Kamath of Mumbai Indians played in the MPL 2016 which gave a boost to the tournament. All the matches were live telecast in local television channels and the matches from quarter final on wards were live on DD Sports Channel.

Teams 
The players of KSCA Mangalore zone, born in Dakshina Kannada, Udupi and Kodagu districts and working or studying in Mangaluru zone, are eligible to take part in the selection trials. The teams from different places of Mangalore zone will be divided into two pools. The participating teams are from Mangalore, Kundapur, Udupi/Manipal, Karkala/Moodbidri, Surthakal/Mulki, Bantwal/Belthangady, Puttur/Sullia, Ullal, Madikeri and Virajpet.

 Surathkal Strikers
 Coastaldigest Mangaluru
 United Ullal
 Udupi Tigers
 Karavali Warriors
 President Sixers, Kundapur
 Kankanadi Knight Riders
 Team Elegant Moodbidri
 Red Hawks Kudla
 Karkala Gladiators
 Spark Avengers, Bolar
 Maestro Titan

Mangalore Premier League 2018 Season 4 featured below 12 franchise.

 Coastaldigest Mangaluru
 United Ullal
 Wise Warriors
 T4 Super Kings
 Classic Bantwal
 Mangalore United
 Team Elegant
 Bedra Bulls
 Karkala Gladiators
 Ali Warriors
 Maestro Titan
 AK Sports Udupi

References 

Sport in Mangalore